Francis Aubrey Shurrock (1887–1977) was a notable New Zealand sculptor and art teacher. He was born in Warrington, Lancashire, England in 1887. He studied under Édouard Lantéri at the Royal College of Art, London from 1909 to 1913.

References

1887 births
1977 deaths
New Zealand art teachers
English emigrants to New Zealand
20th-century New Zealand sculptors
People from Warrington
20th-century New Zealand educators